Gerardo Zamora (born 6 January 1964) is an Argentine politician from Santiago del Estero Province. Governor of Santiago del Estero since 2005, he was a member of the centrist Radical Civic Union (UCR).

Early life and education
Born in rural Bowen, Mendoza Province, Zamora's family moved to Santiago del Estero in 1968. He later became a leader in student politics, serving as President of the UCR student chapter Franja Morada at the Catholic University of Santiago del Estero and as President of the UCR's youth wing for two terms. He became a lawyer and continued his political activities.

Political career
Elected to the Provincial Legislature in Santiago del Estero in 1991, he served in the post until 1993, and was elected Mayor of the city of Santiago del Estero in 1995. He became a provincial deputy once again in 1997 and served as President of the UCR caucus until 1999. In that year he was elected vice-mayor of Santiago del Estero and took over as Mayor in 2001 when the incumbent resigned. In 2003 he was elected Mayor of the city in his own right with 64% of the vote, serving until 2004.

Zamora has been a key UCR supporter of Peronist Presidents Néstor Kirchner and Cristina Fernández de Kirchner (a 'K' Radical, as UCR allies of Kirchnerism are known), and opposed leading UCR figures' plans to support an opposing candidate to the Kirchners in the 2007 presidential elections. He was elected governor in 2005 on the Civic Front for Santiago ticket, with the support of some Peronists and Socialists as well as most Radicals (UCR) in the province.

From 2005 until 2007, Zamora's vice-governor was Emilio Rached; Rached was elected to the Argentine Senate in 2007, and later broke ranks with the governor.  Zamora was re-elected governor in 2008 with 85% of the vote. Governor Zamora sought an amendment to the provincial constitution that would enable a third consecutive term; the amendment was defeated in an October 22, 2013, Argentine Supreme Court ruling, however. His alliance with Kirchnerists had by then led to his break with the UCR, which opted to endorse former Vice Governor Emilio Rached in a Progressive, Civic and Social Front ticket for the upcoming 2013 gubernatorial elections. Zamora nominated his wife, Claudia Ledesma, as the Civic Front for Santiago candidate for governor and she defeated Rached by a 65-to-15% margin; the outgoing governor was concurrently elected to the Argentine Senate.

In 2013, his ex-vicegovernor, Emilio Rached, declared that Zamora acts like the "Mafia"

Supported by President Cristina Fernández de Kirchner in a bid to broaden her support among Radicales K, Zamora was elected Provisional President of the Argentine Senate with the support of Kirchner's majority Front for Victory caucus; he took office on 28 February 2014.

Personal life
Zamora has married twice; he has one son from his first marriage, and two sons and a daughter from his second. His current and second wife, Claudia Ledesma Abdala, has served as Governor of Santiago del Estero and as provisional president of the Senate as well.

References

|-

|-

|-

1964 births
Living people
People from Mendoza Province
Argentine people of Spanish descent
20th-century Argentine lawyers
Mayors of Santiago del Estero
Governors of Santiago del Estero Province
Members of the Argentine Senate for Santiago del Estero
Members of the Chamber of Deputies of Santiago del Estero
Radical Civic Union politicians